Iran B is a  football team run occasionally as support for the Iran national football team. At times, they have played other nations' full teams, and have also played matches against 'A' and 'B' teams from other football associations.

Tournament 
 1974 Iran International Tournament: Semifinals
 1975 Iran International Tournament: Runners-up
 1st Great Wall Cup 1983: 9th place
 1986 Fajr International Tournament: Group stage
 President's Gold Cup 1989: Third place
 2005 Islamic Games: Third place
 2007 WAFF: Champions

Managers
 Heshmat Mohajerani (1975)
 Nasser Ebrahimi (February 1986)
 Bijan Zolfagharnasab (April 2005)
 Parviz Mazloumi (June 2007 to July 2007)
 Markar Aghajanian (January 2012 to November 2012)
 António Simões  (November 2012 to February 2014)
 Oceano da Cruz  (September 2015)

References

B-team
Asian national B association football teams